John Tintori is an American film editor and director. Among his editing credits are Eight Men Out (1988), Dogfight (1991), Mr. Wonderful (1993), Roommates (1995), and David Blaine's documentary Frozen In Time. In 1997 he co-directed and co-edited Chicago Cab with his wife Mary Cybulski. His son Ray Tintori is also in the film industry.

Career

John Tintori's editing works also included TV commercials, video and short films. One of his short films called Trevor bagged the Oscar in 1995. His career work extended to working as associate editor for The Brother from Another Planet, script supervisor, Matewan, editor David Blaine's Frozen in Time for ABC, to name a few. John's repertoire also includes writing screenplays, including Wise Child, Murder Most Foul for Columbia Pictures and Interstate for HBO. John holds the membership of  the Directors Guild of America, the Writers Guild of America, the IATSE,  member the Tisch/Kanbar faculty(since 1997), ex-chair, the Graduate Film Program, NYU (2006 - 2014), and ex-chair, the Graduate Film Program at TischAsia in Singapore.

References

External links
 
 John Tintori profile at Tisch School of the Arts, NYU

American film directors
American film editors
Living people
Year of birth missing (living people)